George Henry Boscawen, 2nd Earl of Falmouth (8 July 1811 – 29 August 1852), styled Lord Boscawen-Rose between 1821 and 1841, was a British peer and politician.

Falmouth was the son of Edward Boscawen, 1st Earl of Falmouth and Anne Frances Bankes. He was returned to Parliament as one of two representatives for Cornwall West in July 1841, a seat he held until December of the same year, when he succeeded his father in the earldom and took his seat in the House of Lords.

Lord Falmouth died in August 1852, aged 41. On his death, the earldom became extinct while he was succeeded in the viscountcy of Falmouth and barony of Boscawen-Rose by his first cousin, Evelyn Boscawen.

References

External links

1811 births
1852 deaths
Earls in the Peerage of the United Kingdom
Members of the Parliament of the United Kingdom for constituencies in Cornwall
UK MPs 1841–1847
UK MPs who inherited peerages
George